The 2021–22 Duke Blue Devils women's basketball team represented Duke University during the 2021–22 NCAA Division I women's basketball season. The Blue Devils were led by second year head coach Kara Lawson and played their home games at Cameron Indoor Stadium in Durham, North Carolina as members of the Atlantic Coast Conference.

The Blue Devils finished the season 17–13 overall and 7–11 in ACC play to finish in tenth place.  As the tenth seed in the ACC tournament, they defeated Pittsburgh in the First Round before losing to seventh seed Miami in the Second Round.  They were not invited to the NCAA tournament or the WNIT despite being ranked as high as No. 15 during the regular season.

Previous season

On December 25, 2020, it was announced that the team would end their season due to COVID-19 concerns.

The Blue Devils finished the season 3–1, and 0–1 in ACC play.  Due to their season cancellation they did not participate in the ACC tournament, NCAA tournament or WNIT.

Off-season

Departures

Incoming transfers

Recruiting Class

Source:

Roster

Schedule

Source

|-
!colspan=9 style="background:#001A57; color:#FFFFFF;"| Exhibition

|-
!colspan=9 style="background:#001A57; color:#FFFFFF;"| Regular season

|-
!colspan=9 style="background:#001A57; color:#FFFFFF;"| ACC Women's Tournament

Rankings
2021–22 NCAA Division I women's basketball rankings

Coaches did not release a Week 2 poll and AP does not release a final poll.

See also
 2021–22 Duke Blue Devils men's basketball team

References

Duke Blue Devils women's basketball seasons
Duke
Duke women's basketball
Duke women's basketball